Naturalism  (19 October 1988 – 13 July 2018) was a New Zealand-bred Australian-trained thoroughbred racehorse.

Background
Foaled in New Zealand on 19 October 1988, Naturalism was a bay stallion sired by Palace Music, a Kentucky-bred, French-trained racehorse who won the Champion Stakes in 1984.  At stud, Palace Music (Naturalism's sire) was best known as the sire of the American champion Cigar. Naturalism was purchased as a yearling for A$35,000 by Anthony Freedman.

Racing career
Naturalism's wins included three Group One races.

According to the Freedman brothers website, Lee Freedman rated Naturalism as one of the five best horses he ever trained. The website also says that "Probably his greatest performance was his second in the Japan Cup, as he wasn't really a 2400m horse."

Naturalism died at Meringo Stud, New South Wales, Australia, on 13 July 2018.

References

1988 racehorse births
2018 racehorse deaths
Thoroughbred family 16-c
Racehorses bred in New Zealand
Racehorses trained in Australia